Georgios Koltsidas (born 23 September 1970) is a retired football player, who played as a defender and was known for his strong tackles. He is currently the general director of Aris.

He started his career with Trikala and joined Aris in July 1992, where he spent the majority of his career – except for a brief one-year spell at Larissa. He retired at the end of the 2007–08 season.

He was a member of the Greece national under-21 football team which won the gold medal at the 1991 Mediterranean Games.

References

External links
Insports.gr profile 
Guardian.co.uk profile

1970 births
Living people
Greek footballers
Aris Thessaloniki F.C. players
Aris Thessaloniki F.C. non-playing staff
Trikala F.C. players
Athlitiki Enosi Larissa F.C. players
Footballers from Trikala
Association football defenders
Mediterranean Games gold medalists for Greece
Mediterranean Games medalists in football
Competitors at the 1991 Mediterranean Games